Seavington St Michael is a village and civil parish in Somerset, England. It lies in a hollow within a larger area of low-lying hills and valleys running broadly east-west. A part of the South Petherton Hundred, originally the area included seven settlements (seven tons) which have gradually merged or vanished, but were the origin of the Seavington—part of the village name.

History
The manor was held by Siward the falconer at the time of the Domesday Book in 1086. By 1252 Adam the Dane then became known as Seavington Dennis. From 1483 to 1539 it was held by Glastonbury Abbey and after the dissolution of the monasteries he passed it to Winchester College, who held it until 1932.

Seavington St Michael—the smaller of the two villages with 57 dwellings and 125 inhabitants—appears to have become the more important since the motor car forced the building of New Road to straighten the London to Exeter route early in the 20th century, thus by-passing Seavington St Mary. Since then, in 1988 the new Ilminster by-pass has eliminated much traffic, although the road through Seavington St Michael is still a major access route to the market town of Ilminster.

Governance
The parish council has responsibility for local issues, including setting an annual precept (local rate) to cover the council’s operating costs and producing annual accounts for public scrutiny. It evaluates local planning applications and works with the local police, district council officers, and neighbourhood watch groups on matters of crime, security, and traffic. Tit is also responsibility for initiating projects for the maintenance and repair of parish facilities, as well as consulting with the district council on the maintenance, repair, and improvement of highways, drainage, footpaths, public transport, and street cleaning. Conservation matters (including trees and listed buildings) and environmental issues are also the responsibility of the council.

The village falls within the Non-metropolitan district of South Somerset, which was formed on 1 April 1974 under the Local Government Act 1972, having previously been part of Chard Rural District. The district council is responsible for local planning and building control, local roads, council housing, environmental health, markets and fairs, refuse collection and recycling, cemeteries and crematoria, leisure services, parks, and tourism.

Somerset County Council is responsible for running the largest and most expensive local services such as education, social services, libraries, main roads, public transport, policing and  fire services, trading standards, waste disposal and strategic planning.

It is also part of the Yeovil county constituency represented in the House of Commons of the Parliament of the United Kingdom. It elects one Member of Parliament (MP) by the first past the post system of election.

Religious sites
The Anglican parish Church of St Michael dates from the late 12th century. It was given a porch around 1291, further alterations in the 15th century and a gallery was added around 1800. It has been designated as a Grade II* listed building.

References

External links
Website for The Seavingtons
Seavington Web Museum

Villages in South Somerset
Civil parishes in Somerset